The First City Theatre of Kyiv in Ukraine was built in 1804–1805, inaugurated in 1806, and dismantled in 1851. It is known as the first theatre in Kyiv.
It was also the first permanent theatre in Ukraine, where the first theatre company had been founded in 1789. The theatre had no permanent staff, but was the locality for theatre companies visiting Kyiv. It was dismantled when the house became too small for the rapidly growing city.

References 

 Рибаков М. О. Невідомі та маловідомі сторінки історії Києва. — К. : Кий, 1997. — С. 260—272. — ISBN 966-7161-15-3.

1806 establishments in Ukraine
Former theatres in Ukraine
Theatres in Kyiv